Dixon is a neighborhood of the city of New Orleans.  A subdistrict of the Uptown/Carrollton Area, its boundaries as defined by the New Orleans City Planning Commission are: Interstate 10 to the northeast, South Carrollton Avenue to the southeast, Palmetto Street to the southwest and Cherry, Dixon, Mistletoe, Peach, Hamilton, Quince and Last Streets to the northwest.

Geography

Adjacent neighborhoods
 Lakewood (north)
 Mid-City (northeast)
 Gert Town (south)
 Hollygrove (southwest)

Boundaries
The New Orleans City Planning Commission defines the boundaries of Dixon as these streets: Interstate 10, South Carrollton Avenue, Palmetto Street, Cherry Street, Dixon Street, Mistletoe Street, Peach Street, Hamilton Street, Quince Street and Last Street.

Demographics
As of the census of 2000, there were 1,772 people, 668 households, and 445 families living in the neighborhood.  The population density was 7,383 /mi2 (2,953 /km2). The racial makeup of the neighborhood was 94.9% African American, 3.2% White, 0.1% Asian, and 0.3% from two or more races. Hispanic or Latino of any race were 1.5% of the population.

As of the census of 2010, there were 1,270 people, 520 households, and 319 families living in the neighborhood.  The racial makeup of the neighborhood was 90.3% African American, 6.0% White, 0.1% Asian, 0.2% American Indian, and 0.6% from two or more races. Hispanic or Latino of any race were 2.8% of the population.

See also
 New Orleans neighborhoods

References

Neighborhoods in New Orleans